Kolana chlamys is a butterfly in the family Lycaenidae. It was described by Druce in 1907. It has been found in Paraguay.

References

Butterflies described in 1907
Eumaeini
Taxa named by Hamilton Herbert Druce